Illegal Civilization, also known as IC, is an American skateboarding company and movie studio founded in North Hollywood by Mikey Alfred. The brand produces clothing, accessories, skateboards, and videos. Outside of skateboarding, Illegal Civilization produces music videos, documentaries, and original short films.

Illegal Civilization is affiliated with the hip-hop collective Odd Future. They filmed documentaries following the creation of Tyler, the Creator's albums Wolf and Cherry Bomb.

Founder Mikey Alfred was a co-producer on Jonah Hill's debut film Mid90s, and the film featured Illegal Civilization skate team members Sunny Suljic, Ryder McLaughlin, Olan Prenatt, Kevin White and Na-Kel Smith.

History 
The company was founded in 2008 by Mikey Alfred and his friends. Initially, they filmed skate videos and handed out t-shirts around North Hollywood. When Alfred was 15, skateboarder and rapper Na-Kel Smith introduced Alfred to Tyler, the Creator, and Alfred became Odd Future's personal videographer. Alfred passed out merchandise and DVDs while on tour with Tyler, the Creator and Frank Ocean, and Illegal Civilization began to gain recognition.

In 2016, the skateboard distributor Baker Boys Distribution began distributing Illegal Civilization merchandise.

In 2020, Illegal Civilization released the critically acclaimed Godspeed (2020) skate video directed by Davonte Jolly. After the release of Godspeed, IC turned Alex Midler, Kevin White, and Zach Saraceno pro.

In May of 2022, Alex Midler, Kevin White, and Zach Saraceno  all quit illegal Civ after not being paid for over a year.

Filmography 
In 2017, Illegal Civilization released a short film starring Mac Miller. Later that year, they began releasing their original mini-series, Summer of '17, starring Illegal Civilization members alongside cameos from rappers Tyler, the Creator and Aminé.

Feature films 

 North Hollywood (2021)

Short films 
 Spark of Life (2011)
 IC1 (2012)
 Tyler the Creator's Making of Wolf Documentary (2013)
 IC2 (2014)
 Tyler the Creator's Cherry Bomb Documentary (2017)
IC3 (2018)
 Godspeed (2020)

Mini-Series 
 Summer of '17 (2017-2019) - (3 Episodes)

Collaborations 

 The skate team appeared in Season 4 of the HBO television series, Ballers, in 2017.
 In August 2018, Illegal Civilization released 3 pairs of shoes in collaboration with Converse.
 Illegal Civilization released a t-shirt in collaboration with Lil Wayne for the 2018 release of Tha Carter V.
The team were featured as cast and crew members in Jonah Hill's feature film Mid90s and released a merchandise collection to promote the film with A24.

References 

Skateboarding companies
North Hollywood, Los Angeles
Tyler, the Creator
American companies established in 2008
2008 establishments in California
Manufacturing companies based in Los Angeles
Film production companies of the United States
Video production companies
Sporting goods manufacturers of the United States